Kent Matthew Osborne (born August 30, 1969) is an American screenwriter, actor, animator, producer, and director. He has worked for such animated television shows as SpongeBob SquarePants, Camp Lazlo, Phineas and Ferb, The Marvelous Misadventures of Flapjack, Adventure Time, Regular Show and The Amazing World of Gumball, he has received multiple Emmy Award nominations and has won twice for Adventure Time (in 2015 and 2017). He is currently the head writer for the Cartoon Network animated series Summer Camp Island, which premiered in 2018, and is also co-producer and story editor for the Disney Channel animated series Kiff. He has also starred in several mumblecore films, including Hannah Takes the Stairs, Nights and Weekends, All the Light in the Sky and Uncle Kent (in the title role). His brother is the director Mark Osborne. Osborne had replaced Walt Dohrn as a storyboard director and writer after Dohrn left SpongeBob to work on more DreamWorks films in 2002.

Early life
Kent Osborne and his brother Mark were raised in Vermont before moving to Flemington, New Jersey. He graduated from Hunterdon Central Regional High School and studied acting in New York at the American Academy of Dramatic Arts and David Mamet's Atlantic Theater Company.

Career
Osborne's first film role was a small part in School Ties (1992) with Brendan Fraser, Matt Damon, Ben Affleck, and Chris O'Donnell. His character Emile in School Ties inspired Osborne to write the screenplay for the film Dropping Out, in which he starred alongside David Koechner, Adam Arkin, John Stamos, Katey Sagal, and Fred Willard. His brother Mark directed the film, which had its world premiere at the 2000 Sundance Film Festival.

Osborne served as writing partner for the comedian Rob Schneider. After recurring appearances on the TBS show Dinner and a Movie, he hosted a spinoff TBS program, Movie Lounge, beginning in 1998–2001.

From 2002 to 2005, Osborne was a writer and a storyboard director for SpongeBob SquarePants on Nickelodeon. He received two Emmy Award nominations for his writing on the show, in 2003 and 2004. He was also one of the writers for the theatrical film, The SpongeBob SquarePants Movie (2004).

Osborne went on to write for other animated series appearing on the Cartoon Network, including Camp Lazlo (Emmy nomination in 2006), The Marvelous Misadventures of Flapjack (Emmy nomination in 2010), and Adventure Time (Emmy nominations in 2010, 2012, 2013, 2014, and 2016, with wins in 2015 and 2017). He also wrote and storyboarded several episodes of the first season of Disney Channel's Phineas and Ferb in 2008.
 
Osborne has been a screenwriter and actor in a number of films associated with the mumblecore movement, including several directed by Joe Swanberg. He co-wrote and acted in Hannah Takes the Stairs (2007) and had a supporting role in Nights and Weekends (2008). For Uncle Kent, which debuted at the 2011 Sundance Film Festival, Osborne served as co-writer and co-producer, as well as playing the title role, loosely based on his own life. He returned to the semi-autobiographical role for the sequel Uncle Kent 2, which premiered at the 2015 SXSW Film Festival.

In 2011, he starred in writer/director Amber Sealey's film How to Cheat. Osborne and his castmates won the award for Best Performance in the Narrative Competition of the 2011 Los Angeles Film Festival.

In 2013, he created the internet series Cat Agent with Rug Burn (founded by staff members of Titmouse, Inc. and Six Point Harness).

Osborne also worked as a voice director for The Marvelous Misadventures of Flapjack, Bee and PuppyCat, Adventure Time and Steven Universe and a story consultant for Cartoon Network Development Studio Europe's very first show ever created The Amazing World of Gumball.

Filmography

Film

Television

References

External links
 
 

1969 births
Living people
American male screenwriters
American male film actors
Film producers from New Jersey
American television writers
Writers from Vermont
American male television writers
Hunterdon Central Regional High School alumni
American storyboard artists
People from Flemington, New Jersey
American voice directors
Primetime Emmy Award winners
Screenwriters from New Jersey
Screenwriters from Vermont
Cartoon Network Studios people
DreamWorks Animation people
Nickelodeon Animation Studio people